A distress hand signal is a hand signal to indicate distress and need of rescue.

At sea, the oldest hand signal to indicate distress is to flap the arms up and down.  Cloth or bright objects may be held to increase visibility.

In aviation, a downed pilot would hold their hands straight above their head to indicate that they want to be picked up.  If they need help repairing their aircraft, they would hold their arms out straight to the side.

During the COVID-19 pandemic, there were extensive lockdowns which kept people at home.  As people then mainly communicated by social media, the Canadian Women's Foundation  (CWF) devised a hand signal called the Signal for Help which women could use to secretly indicate that they were at risk of domestic violence and so needed assistance.  Knowledge of this signal then spread through social media such as TikTok.  In 2021, a girl in Kentucky then used the signal when she had been kidnapped and people who saw it alerted the local police who rescued her.

The CWF signal has the palm outward with the thumb across it.  The fingers are then closed over the thumb to symbolise that one is being held or hurt.

References

Gestures